Jonzier-Épagny is a commune in the Haute-Savoie départment in the Auvergne-Rhône-Alpes region in south-eastern France.

The commune comprises three hamlets (Les Barraques, Épagny, Vigny) and a place named Mont-Sion.

Geography
The commune covers 716 ha of glacial moraine from the Rhône, deposited about 10,000 years ago, and called the Montagne de Sion. The highest point in the commune is at 733 m.

See also
Communes of the Haute-Savoie department

References

Communes of Haute-Savoie